A Lady Surrenders is a 1930 American Pre-Code romantic drama film directed by John M. Stahl and starring Genevieve Tobin, Rose Hobart, Conrad Nagel, and Basil Rathbone. A copy exists in the Library of Congress.

Plot summary
A man is left by his wife and assuming her to be gone forever, he remarries. Complications ensue when his original wife returns home.

Cast
Conrad Nagel as Winthrop Beauvel
Rose Hobart as Isabel Beauvel
Genevieve Tobin as Mary
Basil Rathbone as Carl Vandry
Edgar Norton as Butler
Carmel Myers as Sonia
Franklin Pangborn as Lawton
Vivien Oakland as Mrs. Lynchfield
Grace Cunard as Maid
Virginia Hammond as Woman

References

External links

A Lady Surrender at TCM

Stills and reviews at basilrathbone.net

1930 films
1930 romantic drama films
American romantic drama films
American black-and-white films
1930s English-language films
1930s American films